Wymondham Abbey railway station is a railway station in the town of Wymondham in the English county of Norfolk. The station is served by heritage services operated by the Mid-Norfolk Railway (MNR) between Wymondham and East Dereham.

History
There was historically no station on the exact site now occupied by Wymondham Abbey, although it stands close to the site of the sidings for the Briton's Brush Works, which operated from 1890 to 1985.  Access to the sidings was controlled by Church Lane signal box, the remains of which still being visible at the site.

A short-lived station was located on the far side of the level crossing to the current platform, with footings for it being discovered during ground works for a new signal box.

Present day
The current Wymondham Abbey railway station, opened in 1999, is the current southern terminus of passenger services on the MNR, although the line continues beyond Wymondham Abbey to a junction with the Breckland Line at Wymondham railway station. The line between Wymondham Abbey and the Breckland Line is used for stock movements, freight and works trains, for the reversal of the majority of hauled passenger trains and, during special events, timetabled passenger services as far as the operational boundary with Network Rail.

There is minimal car parking at this station, therefore visitors are advised to use parking facilities in Wymondham town centre or make use of the car park at Dereham.

Signal box
The original Church Lane signal box footings survive, but are not located in a suitable location for current needs.  A replacement box, using the signal box cabin from Spooner Row railway station is being constructed beside the level crossing, on the northern end of the original station platform.

Route

References

Heritage railway stations in Norfolk
Railway stations built for UK heritage railways
Railway stations in Great Britain opened in 1999